During the 2005–06 season, Newcastle United participated in the Premier League.

Season summary
In July 2005 rumours circulated that Newcastle was being stalked with a new buyer, but this later emerged to be the Shepherds consolidating their interests. On the pitch, Newcastle were eliminated from the Intertoto Cup after a 4–2 aggregate loss to Deportivo La Coruna in the semi-final, eliminating the club from European competition for the season.

Upon Craig Bellamy's return from his loan to Celtic, it was reported that he had not resolved his differences with Souness or Shearer, and was sold to Blackburn Rovers for £5 million. During the summer transfer window, Patrick Kluivert, Jermaine Jenas, Aaron Hughes and Andy O'Brien were sold by Souness. Laurent Robert and James Milner were loaned out, to Portsmouth and Aston Villa respectively (Robert would be transferred to Benfica in January). The club signed Emre, Scott Parker, Craig Moore and Albert Luque.

In August, the club signed Michael Owen from Real Madrid, despite strong interest from Owen's former club Liverpool. The fee, £17 million, surpassed Newcastle's previous record of £15 million for Alan Shearer from Blackburn in 1996. In the closing hours of the transfer window, the club re-signed Nolberto Solano from Aston Villa.

Souness's decision to pair Shearer and Owen together up front proved to be lethal, but Owen broke his fourth metatarsal bone in his foot after a clash with Paul Robinson in a match against Tottenham Hotspur, keeping him out for the rest of the season. With Owen injured the team's form dipped.

Souness was sacked as manager following a 3–0 defeat to Manchester City in early February. Shay Given, Robbie Elliott and Alan Shearer have since stated that the fans never really took to him, with his favouritism of players damaging morale and a series of injuries leading to poor form.

United's youth academy director, former West Ham United manager Glenn Roeder, was put in charge as caretaker manager. Upon Roeder's first game in charge, against Portsmouth, Alan Shearer scored his 201st goal for the club, breaking Jackie Milburn's record of 200 goals for the club and becoming the club's highest ever goalscorer.

Despite speculation that Bolton Wanderers manager Sam Allardyce was interested in taking charge, Roeder guided Newcastle from 15th place to 7th place by the end of the season, winning 9 out of their remaining 14 Premier League games to see the club qualify for the UEFA Intertoto Cup - a great way for club legend Alan Shearer to end his playing career. Despite the exit from the FA Cup at the hands of Chelsea, Roeder was praised for amazingly achieving a European spot, having seen the prospect of a relegation battle when he joined. At the end of the season he was given a two-year contract by chairman Freddie Shepherd.

Final league table

Kit
Newcastle's kit for the 2005–06 season was produced by German company Adidas. The main shirt sponsor was British bank Northern Rock.

Transfers

In
{| border="0" style="width:100%;"
|-
|  style="background:#fff; text-align:left; vertical-align:top; width:100%;"|

Out
{| border="0" style="width:100%;"
|-
|  style="background:#fff; text-align:left; vertical-align:top; width:100%;"|

First-team squad
The following players made appearances for the first-team squad this season.

Left club during season

Coaching staff

Reserve squad
The following players spent most of the season playing for the reserves, and did not appear for the first team this season.

Trialists

Match results

Pre-season

UEFA Intertoto Cup

Premier League

FA Cup

League Cup

Alan Shearer testimonial

Statistics

Appearances and goals

|-
! colspan=14 style=background:#dcdcdc; text-align:center| Goalkeepers

|-
! colspan=14 style=background:#dcdcdc; text-align:center| Defenders

|-
! colspan=14 style=background:#dcdcdc; text-align:center| Midfielders

|-
! colspan=14 style=background:#dcdcdc; text-align:center| Forwards

|-
! colspan=14 style=background:#dcdcdc; text-align:center| Players transferred out during the season

References

External links
FootballSquads - Newcastle United - 2005/06

Newcastle United F.C. seasons
Newcastle United